Elections to the French National Assembly were held in Guinea on 17 June 1951. The number of seats Guinea had in the Assembly had increased from two to three. Suffrage was also extended, with the number of registered voters increasing from 131,309 in the 1946 election to 393,628 in 1951, although voter turnout decreased from 73% to 57%.

The Socialist List of the Guinean Union won two seats (Yacine Diallo and Albert Liurette) with the Guinean Agreement winning the other (Mamba Sano).

Results

References

Elections in Guinea
Guinea
1951 in Guinea